James Bevan Bowen (1828 – 14 November 1905) was a British politician, Conservative Member of Parliament for Pembrokeshire from 1866 to 1868 and again from 1876 to 1880.

He won a by-election in 1866, caused by the death of the sitting member George Lort Phillips, which was unopposed by the Liberals.  However, he lost his candidacy for the 1868 general election in favour of John Scourfield, who had been the member for Haverfordwest since 1852, which fell to the Liberals.  Scourfield died in 1876, and Bowen won his second by-election to his old seat.  He lost the seat at the next general election in 1880 to the Liberal William Davies.

In 1889, he was defeated in the inaugural elections for Pembrokeshire County Council. He was subsequently made an alderman.

His son was George Bevan Bowen.

References

1828 births
1905 deaths
Conservative Party (UK) MPs for Welsh constituencies
Members of the Parliament of the United Kingdom for Pembrokeshire constituencies
UK MPs 1865–1868
UK MPs 1874–1880